The Bex–Villars–Bretaye Railway (BVB) is a metre gauge railway line operating between the towns of Bex and  Villars-sur-Ollon and the Col de Bretaye mountain pass, situated in the Chablais region of southwest Switzerland. It is, in fact, two railways, one mixed adhesion and rack worked between Bex and Villars-sur-Ollon, the other, linking Villars to the Col de Bretaye being worked on the Abt rack system. Passengers making the full journey are required to change trains at Villars.

History 
The authority to construct the railway was gained in three stages, that from Bex, a small town on the main Lausanne–Simplon railway, to Villars-sur-Ollon on 15 October 1897; from Villars to Chesières on 19 December 1905 and from Villars to Bretaye on 5 October 1911. The lines were opened in five stages. A tramway was opened from Bex to Bévieux on 10 September 1898, continuing to Gryon from 3 June 1900 as a rack railway and reaching Villars, again as tramway, just over one year later. The line from Villars to Chesières was opened on 12 August 1901, less than eight months after authorisation while the final link, that from Villars to Bretaye, opened on 18 December 1913 as a distinct company. The two companies BGVC and VB merged in 1943. However, the company was officially registered as "Forces motrices de l'Avançon" and this company still exists. Simply, the railway no longer belongs to this company. Since 1999 the line has been operated as part of the Transports Publics du Chablais and details from that date of investments are included under that heading.

Line 
Of this length, 7.34 km is operated on the Abt rack system.

The first part of the line, reflecting its tramway history, runs alongside and through the streets of Bex from its terminal in the square outside the main line station.  For many years, the 3.4-km section between Bex station and Bévieux had a regular tram service in addition to the through service, albeit running only approximately hourly, using 1948-built three-axle trams 15 and 16.  A bus service replaced the tram service in 2002, but in 2007 it was reported that a single round trip was still scheduled to take place each weekday, departing Bévieux at 7:01 and Bex at 7:15, using one of the 1948 trams.  In 2013, this round trip was still being operated and was scheduled to depart Bévieux at 6:58 and return from Bex at 7:12, on weekdays only.

Electrical power is provided at  through an overhead contact wire.

Locomotives, railcars, and rolling stock 
The passenger services on the line are operated by railcars (self-propelled railway vehicles; in French automotrice), either singly or with driving-trailer cars (voiture pilote) or the more recently built twin-unit railcars (automotrice-double) of class Beh4/8.  A full list is given below based on the official stock list of the railway together with personal observation.

Most of the goods wagons used on the line date from 1900–1910.

Abbreviations 
ACMV....Ateliers de constructions mécaniques de Vevey
BBC.....Brown, Boveri & Cie
BT......Bombardier Transportation
SAAS....S. A. Ateliers de Secheron, Geneva
SIG.....Societe Industrielle
SLM.....Schweizerische Lokomotiv- und Maschinenfabrik, Winterthur

See also 
List of mountain railways in Switzerland

References

External links

 BVB website 

Railway lines in Switzerland
Transports Publics du Chablais lines
Mountain railways
Metre gauge railways in Switzerland
Rack railways in Switzerland